Odette is a 1928 German silent drama film based upon the play by Victorien Sardou, directed by Luitz-Morat, and starring Francesca Bertini, Warwick Ward, and Simone Vaudry. Bertini would star in two other adaptations of the play, Odette (1916) and Odette (1934).

The film's sets were designed by the art directors Emil Hasler and Oscar Friedrich Werndorff.

Cast
 Francesca Bertini as Odette
 Warwick Ward as Graf Georg de Clermont-Latour, ihr Mann
 Simone Vaudry as Jacqueline, beider Tochter
 Fred Solm as Marquis Gaston de Meyran
 Fritz Kortner as Frontenac
 Angelo Ferrari as Cardeilhan
 Alfred Gerasch as Philippe La Hoche

References

Bibliography
 Goble, Alan. The Complete Index to Literary Sources in Film. Walter de Gruyter, 1999.

External links

1928 films
Films of the Weimar Republic
German silent feature films
1920s German-language films
German films based on plays
Films based on works by Victorien Sardou
Remakes of Italian films
Films directed by Luitz-Morat
German black-and-white films
1928 drama films
German drama films
Silent drama films
1920s German films